Neil Baker (born 8 June 1960) is a former professional rugby league footballer who played in the 1980s.

Neil Baker played three seasons at the Canterbury-Bankstown Bulldogs between 1981-1983. He also was a useful goal-kicker, top scoring for South Sydney Rabbitohs in 1984, 1985 and 1986. In 1985 he won the Dally M award for best  of the season. Baker had a cult following at South Sydney, with fans calling him "Bionic Baker", and making banners with his name on them to wave at matches. He finished his Sydney career at the Penrith Panthers between 1988-1989. In 1992, Baker captain-coached Newcastle Western Suburbs to win the Clayton Cup.

References

External links
Bulldogs profile

1960 births
Living people
Australian expatriate sportspeople in England
Rugby league five-eighths
Canterbury-Bankstown Bulldogs players
South Sydney Rabbitohs players
Salford Red Devils players
Penrith Panthers players
Rugby league fullbacks
Place of birth missing (living people)